NoFit State Circus is a contemporary circus company based in Cardiff, Wales.

Formed in 1986, NoFit State Circus has toured tented and theatrical shows at home and abroad. They also maintain an active education programme and run community projects that allow non-professional performers to devise circus work, working alongside the company's own professionals.

Shows

Immortal 
The company's first large-scale show Immortal was described by The Scotsman newspaper as circus that "celebrates the human soul rather than just the human body", and elsewhere lauded as "rich, powerful stuff [...] overwhelming in its diversity of ideas". Writing in The Times, dance critic Donald Hutera gave a more measured response, saying that it was better to "surrender to the show's deceptively shambolic quicksilver atmosphere" than concentrate overmuch on the plot. Immortal won a Tap Water Award, an Editor's Choice Award from threeweeks.co.uk, and The Jury Award at Spain's Tarrega Festival.

Tabú 
NoFit State's next show, Tabú, premiered at Tredegar Park, Newport, in April 2008, and has been touring Britain and Europe since then. Directed by Firenza Guidi, who also worked on Immortal, Tabú shares much of Immortal's visual and narrative style and carries over some of the old cast. It has received mixed reviews. Lyn Gardner writing for The Guardian called it "fabulous stuff that owes more to contemporary dance and experimental theatre than it does to sawdust and elephants", but others have criticized that the live show seems to have "no connection with the programme's bogglingly detailed back story", and that the circus skills on display "don't dramatise the original concept".

Bianco 
In 2012, the company developed its show Bianco: Time for Beauty in partnership with the Eden Project. The promenade show, also directed by Firenza Guidi, ran in the tented performance space throughout the summer, and was described by This Is Cornwall as "an incredible experience". The show was then redeveloped to incorporate new ideas, acts and performers in 2013 to become Bianco: Turning Savage. It opened at The Roundhouse in April 2013, and was praised by The Guardian newspaper for "combining first-rate skills with a joyful, unashamed pleasure". Bianco: Turning Savage went on to tour venues across the UK in NoFit State's custom-designed big top spaceship tent, including a sell-out run at the Edinburgh Fringe Festival in August 2013. In 2014 the show toured Perth, Australia and around Europe continuing into 2015.

Noodles 
NoFit State's show Noodles premiered at the 2013 Edinburgh Fringe Festival. The production, by Finnish circus director Maksim Komaro, was staged in a traditional theatre setting and received mixed reviews.

Other activities 
The company has also participated in outdoor work. Both Parklife and Open House were directed by Orit Azaz, and operated by inviting local amateur and professional performance groups to train in public, with NoFit State performers. Barricade, also directed by Azaz, was a large-scale outdoor performance that played to audiences in the UK and France.

Since 2006 NoFit State has been running a permanent training space and school in Cardiff. They provide a variety of aerial and ground-based classes for all experience levels, including ropes, silks, aerial hoop, static trapeze, acro-balance and juggling. The company runs a youth circus program, with some of their students going on to study at Circomedia.

In January 2015, NoFit State was invited to the south of France as a featured company at the first edition of the Biennale Internationale des Arts du Cirque.

On 11 December 2015, the company launched a 30th-anniversary exhibition at its Four Elms building in Adamsdown, Cardiff, as well as the NoFit State E-Archive, which details the company's 30-year history. On the same night, the company's co-founder and one of its creative directors, Ali Williams, announced that she was to step down from her current role with the company, later in 2016. 

In 2016, the NoFit State celebrated its 30th anniversary.  In February the company made its Chinese premiere performing Bianco at Queen Elizabeth Stadium in Hong Kong, and later on, in May, its US debut in partnership with St. Ann's Warehouse in New York City.

They also do sessions for younger children and adults.

History
 Immortal: 2002–2006
 Tabu: 2008–2010
 Labyrinth: 2011`
 Mundo Paralelo: 2012
 Barricade: 2012
 Parklife: 2012
 Bianco: 2012–2015
 Noodles: 2013–2015
 Open House: 2013–2015 
 Block: 2016–
 Lexicon: 2018
Sabotage: 2022

Notes

External links
 Official website

Organisations based in Cardiff
Circuses